Junichi Kuriuzawa (born 25 February 1965 in Ōfunato) is a Japanese former volleyball player who competed in the 1992 Summer Olympics.

References

1965 births
Living people
Japanese men's volleyball players
Olympic volleyball players of Japan
Volleyball players at the 1992 Summer Olympics
People from Iwate Prefecture
20th-century Japanese people
21st-century Japanese people